The 1978 RAC Tricentrol British Saloon Car Championship was the 21st season of the British Saloon Car Championship. It was the first year that the championship was sponsored by Tricentrol. The drivers title was won by Richard Longman in a Mini 1275 GT, and was the first to be won by a Mini driver since 1969.

Calendar & Winners
All races were held in the United Kingdom. Overall winners in bold.

Championship results

References

British Touring Car Championship seasons
Saloon